John Conover Nichols (August 31, 1896November 7, 1945) was an American lawyer, World War I veteran, and politician who served four terms as a U.S. Representative from Oklahoma from 1935 to 1943.

Biography
Born in Joplin, Missouri, Nichols was  the son of John Adams and Mary Catherine Conover Nichols. He attended the public schools in Joplin, Missouri, and Colorado Springs, Colorado, and the teachers college at Emporia, Kansas. He married Marion Young in Tulsa on March 30, 1921. She was the daughter of William Buford and Nina Young of Eufaula. The Nichols had a daughter, Nina Jean, and a son, Dan. He studied law in the office of his brother in Eufaula, Oklahoma; and was admitted to the bar association in 1926 and commenced practice in Eufaula, Oklahoma.

Career
During World War I Nichols served in the 19th Infantry, United States Army from 1917 to 1919.

Nichols was elected as a Democrat to the 74th Congress and to the four succeeding Congresses and served from January 3, 1935, until his resignation on July 3, 1943,  to become vice president of Transcontinental & Western Airlines. While in office, he served on the Rivers and Harbors, Merchant Marine and Fisheries, Territories Committees. In 1935 and 1937 he was also a member of a special committee that went to Hawaii to hold hearings on statehood. His legislative interests focused on American Indians, soil conservation, old-age pensions, Civilian Conservation Corp (CCC) camps, and aviation.

Death
Still vice president of Transcontinental & Western Airlines, Nichols died in an airplane crash at Asmara in Eritrea (then under a British Military Administration), on November 7, 1945.

He was originally interred in the United States military cemetery at Asmara, Eritrea, but his body was later moved and reinterred at Greenwood Cemetery in Eufaula, Oklahoma.

References

External links

 Retrieved on 2009-02-22
John C. Nichols Collection at the Carl Albert Center

1896 births
1945 deaths
Politicians from Joplin, Missouri
People from Eufaula, Oklahoma
Emporia State University alumni
Oklahoma lawyers
United States Army soldiers
United States Army personnel of World War I
Victims of aviation accidents or incidents in Eritrea
Democratic Party members of the United States House of Representatives from Oklahoma
20th-century American politicians
20th-century American lawyers